Ian Charles Blayney (born 2 February 1962) is an Australian politician. 

He was born in Geraldton, Western Australia. He has been a member of the Western Australian Legislative Assembly since the 2008 state election, representing Geraldton. He won the seat of Geraldton as a Liberal candidate, defeating sitting Labor member Shane Hill after a redistribution made the seat notionally Liberal. He holds an Associate Diploma of Agriculture.

Blayney was comfortably reelected in 2013, but faced a closer-than-expected contest in 2017 against Labor candidate Lara Dalton. He went into the election sitting on a seemingly insurmountable margin of 22.8 percent in a "traditional" two-party contest with Labor, but suffered a swing of 21.5 percent, paring back his margin to an extremely marginal 1.3 percent. He actually trailed Dalton by 1,300 votes on the first count, but was elected on WA National and One Nation preferences.

On 24 July 2019, Blayney announced he had resigned from the Liberal Party, and applied to join the WA Nationals. The move after he lost his post as shadow agriculture minister in a reshuffle, but Blayney claimed it had "not greatly" affected his thinking. He was accepted into the National Party on 17 August 2019 by their leader, Mia Davies. Dalton sought a rematch at the 2021 election, and handily defeated him amid Labor's decisive victory that year.

References

1962 births
Living people
Liberal Party of Australia members of the Parliament of Western Australia
National Party of Australia members of the Parliament of Western Australia
Independent members of the Parliament of Western Australia
Members of the Western Australian Legislative Assembly
21st-century Australian politicians